Austranillus is a genus of ground beetles in the family Carabidae. There are at least two described species in Austranillus.

Species
These two species belong to the genus Austranillus:
 Austranillus jinayrianus Giachino; Eberhard & Perina, 2021
 Austranillus macleayi (Lea, 1906)

References

Trechinae